William McLellan may refer to:

William McLellan (Australian politician) (1831–1906), mining agent and politician in colonial Victoria
William McLellan (Scottish electrical engineer) (1874–1934), known for contributions to hydroelectric power
William McLellan (American electrical engineer) (1924–2011), known for contributions to nanotechnology
 William Walker McLellan (1873–1960), founder of McLellan Stores
 William H. McLellan (1832–1912), American lawyer and politician

See also
 William Maclellan (15th century), Scottish nobleman
 William E. McLellin (1806–1883), early leader in the Latter Day Saint movement